Concetta Rosa Maria Franconero (born December 12, 1937),
known professionally as Connie Francis, is an American pop singer, actress, and top-charting female vocalist of the late 1950s and early 1960s. Called the “First Lady of Rock & Roll” in one headline of a marginal publication, she is estimated to have sold more than 100 million records worldwide.

In 1960, Francis was recognized as the most successful female artist in Germany, Japan, the United Kingdom, Italy, Australia and in every other country where records were purchased. She was the first woman in history to reach No. 1 on the Billboard Hot 100, just one of her other 53 career hits.

Biography

1937–1955: Early life and first appearances
Francis was born to an Italian-American family in the Ironbound neighborhood of Newark, New Jersey, the first child of George and Ida (née Ferrari-di Vito) Franconero, spending her first years in the Crown Heights, Brooklyn area (Utica Avenue/St. Marks Avenue) before the family moved to New Jersey.

Growing up in an Italian-Jewish neighborhood, Francis became fluent in Yiddish, which led her later to record songs in Yiddish and Hebrew.

In her autobiography Who's Sorry Now? published in 1984, Francis recalls that she was encouraged by her father to appear regularly at talent contests, pageants, and other neighborhood festivities from the age of four as a singer and accordion player.

Francis attended Newark Arts High School in 1951 and 1952. She and her family moved to Belleville, New Jersey, where Francis graduated as salutatorian from Belleville High School Class of 1955.

During this time, Francis continued to perform at neighborhood festivities and talent shows (some of which were broadcast on television), appearing alternately as Concetta Franconero and Connie Franconero. Under the latter name, she also appeared on NBC's variety show Startime Kids between 1953 and 1955.

During the rehearsals for her appearance on Arthur Godfrey's Talent Scouts in December 1950, Francis was advised by Godfrey to change her stage name to Connie Francis for the sake of easier pronunciation. Godfrey also told her to drop the accordion—advice she gladly followed, as she had begun to hate the large and heavy instrument. Around the same time, Francis took a job as a singer on demonstration records, which brought unreleased songs to the attention of established singers and/or their management who might choose to record them for a professional commercial record.

1955–1957: Recording contract and commercial failures
In 1955, Startime Kids went off the air. In May that same year, George Franconero Sr. and Francis's manager George Scheck raised money for a recording session of four songs which they hoped to sell to a major record company under Francis's own name. Finally, even when MGM Records decided to sign a contract with her, it was basically because one track she had recorded, "Freddy", happened to be the name of the son of a company co-executive, Harry A. Meyerson, who thought of this song as a nice birthday gift. Hence, "Freddy" was released as Francis's first single, which turned out to be a commercial failure, just as her following eight solo singles were.

Despite these failures, Francis was hired to record the vocals for Tuesday Weld's "singing" scenes in the 1956 movie Rock, Rock, Rock, and for Freda Holloway in the 1957 Warner Brothers rock and roll movie Jamboree.

In the fall of 1957, Francis enjoyed her first chart success with a duet single she had recorded with Marvin Rainwater: "The Majesty of Love", with "You, My Darlin' You" as the B-side, peaked at number 93 on the Billboard Hot 100. Eventually, the single sold over one million copies.

1957–1959: Last chance and breakthrough
However, her minor chart success came too late for her record label—Francis's recording contract consisted of ten solo singles and one duet single. Though success had finally seemed to come with "The Majesty of Love", Francis was informed by MGM Records that her contract would not be renewed after her last solo single.

Francis considered a career in medicine and was about to accept a four-year scholarship offered at New York University. At what was to have been her final recording session for MGM on October 2, 1957, with Joe Lipman and his orchestra, she recorded a cover version of the 1923 song "Who's Sorry Now?" written by Bert Kalmar and Harry Ruby. Francis has said that she recorded it at the insistence of her father, who was convinced it stood a chance of becoming a hit because it was a song adults already knew and that teenagers would dance to if it had a contemporary arrangement.

Francis, who did not like the song and had been arguing about it with her father heatedly, delayed the recording of the two other songs during the session so much that, in her opinion, no time was left on the continuously running recording tape. Her father insisted, though, and when the recording "Who's Sorry Now?" was finished, only a few seconds were left on the tape.

The single seemed to go unnoticed like all previous releases, just as Francis had predicted, but on January 1, 1958, it debuted on Dick Clark's American Bandstand. Francis watched the show and wrote in her diary:

I heard Dick Clark mention something about a new girl singer. So, what else is new? Another girl singer. There are ninety-five millions females in the country, and I'll bet ninety-five percent of them sing. "There's no doubt about it", predicted Mr. Clark. "She's is headed straight for the number one spot". I began feeling sorry for myself and a bit envious, too. Good luck to her, I thought. And then Mr. Clark just happened to play a song called "Who's sorry now" - MY "Who's Sorry Now"!  Well, the feeling was cosmic - just cosmic! Right there in my living-room, it became Mardi Gras-time, the kick-off at the Super Bowl, and New Year's Eve at the turn of the century!

And on February 15 of that same year, Francis performed it on the first episode of The Saturday Night Beechnut Show, also hosted by Clark. By mid-year, over a million copies had been sold, and Francis was suddenly launched into worldwide stardom. In April 1958, "Who's Sorry Now?" reached number 1 on the UK Singles Chart and number 4 in the US. For the next four years, Francis was voted the "Best Female Vocalist" by American Bandstand viewers.

As Connie Francis explains at each of her concerts, she began searching for a new hit immediately after the success of "Who's Sorry Now?" since MGM Records had renewed her contract. After the relative failure of the follow-up singles "I'm Sorry I Made You Cry" (which stalled at No. 36) and "Heartaches" (failing to chart at all), Francis met Neil Sedaka and Howard Greenfield, who sang a number of ballads they had written for her. After a few hours, Francis began writing in her diary while the songwriters played the last of their ballads. (This, and her refusal to let Sedaka and Greenfield see the diary to mine it for material, inspired the duo to write Sedaka's own breakthrough hit "The Diary.") Afterwards, Francis told them that she considered their ballads too intellectual and sophisticated for the young generation and requested a more lively song. Greenfield urged Sedaka to sing a song they had written that morning with the Shepherd Sisters in mind. Sedaka protested that Francis would be insulted, but Greenfield said that since she hated all the other songs they had performed, they had nothing to lose. Sedaka then played "Stupid Cupid." When he finished, Francis announced that he had just played her new hit song. It went on to reach number 14 on the Billboard chart and was her second number 1 in the UK.

The success of "Stupid Cupid" restored momentum to Francis' chart career, and she reached the U.S. top 40 an additional eight times during the remainder of the 1950s. She managed to churn out more hits by covering several older songs, such as "My Happiness" (number 2 on the Hot 100) and "Among My Souvenirs" (number 7), as well as performing her own original songs. In 1959, she gained two gold records for a double-sided hit: on the A-side, "Lipstick on Your Collar" (number 5), and on the B-side, "Frankie" (number 9).

1959–1973: International recording star
Following another idea from her father, Francis traveled to London in August 1959 to record an Italian album at EMI's famous Abbey Road Studios. Titled Connie Francis Sings Italian Favorites, the album was released in November 1959. It soon entered the album charts where it remained for 81 weeks, peaking at number 4. To this day, it is still Francis's most successful album. "Mama," the single taken from the album, reached number 8 in the United States and number 2 in the United Kingdom.

Following this success, Francis recorded seven more albums of "favorites" between 1960 and 1964, including Jewish, German, and Irish, among others. These albums marked Francis's transition from the youth-oriented rock 'n' roll music to adult contemporary music, which George Franconero, Sr. had realized to be necessary if his daughter wanted to pursue a successful longterm career in music.

Nevertheless, Francis continued to record singles aimed at the youth-oriented market. Among her top-ten hits on the Hot 100 were "Breakin' in a Brand New Broken Heart" (1961, number 7), "When the Boy in Your Arms (Is the Boy in Your Heart)" (1961, number 10), "Second Hand Love" (1962, number 7), and "Where the Boys Are" (1961, number 4). The last became her signature tune and was also the theme song of Francis's first motion picture of the same name. The movie also introduced the concept of spring break, as the once sleepy town of Fort Lauderdale became the hotspot for college students on their spring vacation in the wake of the movie's success.

The success of "Connie Francis Sings Italian Favorites" in late 1959/early 1960 led Francis to become one of the first American artists to record in other languages regularly. She was to be followed by other major British and American recording stars including Wanda Jackson, Cliff Richard, Petula Clark, Brenda Lee, the Supremes, Peggy March, Pat Boone, Lesley Gore, the Beatles and Johnny Cash, among many others. In her autobiography, Francis mentioned that in the early years of her career, the language barrier in certain European countries made it difficult for her songs to get airplay, especially in Germany.

Francis used these reflections as the basis for her April 1960 recording, "Everybody's Somebody's Fool" which would go on to become the first single by a female artist to top the Hot 100. Veteran lyricist Ralph Maria Siegel penned a set of German lyrics, named "Die Liebe ist ein seltsames Spiel", which, after some friction between Francis and her MGM executives, was recorded and released. The song peaked at number 1 in West Germany. She had two more number one hits there, "Paradiso" in September 1962 and "Barcarole in der Nacht" in July 1963.

It was not until her number 7 on the US charts, "Many Tears Ago", later in 1960 when Francis began to record cover versions of her own songs in foreign languages besides German. Over the following years, she eventually expanded her recording portfolio up to 15 languages. She also sang in Romanian during a live performance at the 1970 edition of the Cerbul de Aur in Brașov, Romania. Francis was not fluent in all of these languages and she had to learn her foreign language songs phonetically. Francis explained in a 1961 television interview that she was fluent in Spanish and Italian, but always had a translator nearby to make sure her translated lyrics and especially her pronunciation were as correct as possible.

In the wake of "Die Liebe ist ein seltsames Spiel", Francis enjoyed her greatest successes outside the United States. During the 1960s, her songs not only topped the charts in numerous countries around the world, but she was also voted the number 1 singer in over 10 countries. In 1960, she was named the most popular artist in Europe, the first time a non-European received this honor. From mid-1961 to mid-1963, Radio Luxembourg closed each day's broadcasts with "It's Time to Say Goodnight", a song Francis had recorded especially for this purpose and which was never officially released until 1996.

Francis's enduring popularity overseas led to her having television specials in numerous countries around the world, such as Britain, Germany, Spain and Italy. Even at the height of the Cold War, Francis's music was well received in Iron Curtain countries, and some of her recordings were made available on state-owned record labels such as Melodiya in the former Soviet Union and on Jugoton in former Yugoslavia, although it was common knowledge that rock 'n' roll was highly looked down upon in Eastern bloc countries.

In the US, Connie Francis had a third number-one hit in 1962: "Don't Break the Heart That Loves You", and her success led MGM to give her complete freedom to choose whichever songs she wanted to record.

Francis's first autobiographical book, For Every Young Heart, was published in 1963. On July 3 that same year, she played a Royal Command Performance for Queen Elizabeth II at the Alhambra Theatre in Glasgow, Scotland. During the height of the Vietnam War in 1967, Connie Francis performed for US troops. Francis recalls this story frequently during the introduction to "God Bless America" at her live concerts.

Due to changing trends in the early and mid-1960s, namely the British Invasion, Francis's chart success on Billboard's Hot 100 began to wane after 1963. She had her final top-ten hit, "Vacation", in 1962. A number of Francis's singles continued to reach the top 40 in the US Hot 100 through the mid-1960s, with her last top-40 entry in 1964 being her cover version of "Be Anything (but Be Mine)", a 1952 song made famous by singer/bandleader Eddy Howard. Despite her declining success on the Hot 100, Francis remained a top concert draw, and her singles – now following a more mature style – were charting on the top quarter of Billboard's Adult Contemporary (AC) Charts and sometimes even reached Billboard's Country Charts. Therefore, Francis enjoyed lasting chart success in the US until her contract with MGM Records ran out in 1969.

In 1965, Connie Francis participated in that year's edition of the annual San Remo Festival, where her team partner Gigliola Cinquetti and she presented "Ho bisogno di vederti", which finished on number 5 of the final ranking.

Francis returned to San Remo in 1967 to present "Canta Ragazzina" with her team partner Bobby Solo. In the US, however, "Time Alone Will Tell", Francis's cover version of San Remo's 1967 winning entry "Non pensare a me" which had been presented by Iva Zanicchi and Claudio Villa, peaked at number 94 on Billboard's Hot 100 and at number 14 on Billboard's AC charts.

In 1973, Francis returned to the recording studio, cutting "(Should I) Tie a Yellow Ribbon Round the Old Oak Tree?", b/w "Paint the Rain" on GSF Records. This answer song to "Tie a Yellow Ribbon Round the Old Oak Tree" by Tony Orlando & Dawn bubbled under the charts. The project of recording a German version, though, remained unfinished.

1974–1981: Tragedy and return
After her modest success with "(Should I) Tie a Yellow Ribbon Round the Old Oak Tree?" Francis began performing regularly again. While appearing at the Westbury Music Fair in New York, on November 8, 1974, Francis was raped at the Jericho Turnpike Howard Johnson's Lodge in Jericho, New York, and nearly suffocated under the weight of a heavy mattress the culprit had thrown upon her. She subsequently sued the motel chain for failing to provide adequate security and reportedly won a $2.5 million judgment, at the time one of the largest such judgments in history, leading to a reform in hotel security. Her rapist was never found. During the years after the incident, Francis went into depression, taking as many as 50 Darvon pills a day and rarely leaving her home in Essex Fells, New Jersey.

In 1977, Francis underwent nasal surgery and completely lost her voice. She went through three more operations to regain her singing voice and was unable to sing for four years.

In 1978, Francis returned to the recording studio to cut an album titled Who's Happy Now? The leading recording on this album was a disco version of "Where the Boys Are". She recorded the song also in Japanese, Italian, and Spanish, as she had done before with her original 1960 version. Several songs from the Who's Happy Now? sessions were subsequently recorded in Italian, Spanish, Japanese, and German. The Spanish and German recordings became albums of their own in as Connie Francis en Español in Spain and as Was ich bin (What I Am) in Germany. All three albums and the singles culled from them were released on United Artists Records.

Francis returned to the recording studio in 1981 to cut "Comme ci, comme ça", and "I'm Me Again", the latter of which became the title track of an album which featured the aforementioned new songs. "I'm Me Again" became Francis' last single to chart on the AC charts.

1981–1988: More tragedy
In 1981, further tragedy struck Francis when her brother, George Franconero, Jr., with whom she was very close, was murdered by Mafia hitmen.

Despite that, she took up live performing again, even gracing the American Bandstand 30th Anniversary Special Episode, and appearing in the town where she had been raped. Francis' new-found success was short-lived, though, as she was diagnosed with manic depression, which again brought her career to a halt, and she was committed to multiple psychiatric hospitals. Francis attempted suicide in 1984.

Nevertheless, in 1984, Francis was able to write and publish her autobiography, Who's Sorry Now?, which became a New York Times bestseller.

1989–2018: Later career
In 1989, Francis resumed her recording and performing career again. For Malaco Records, Francis recorded a double album entitled Where the Hits Are, containing re-recordings of 18 of her biggest hits, as well as six classics of yesteryear Francis had always wanted to record such as "Are You Lonesome Tonight?" and "Torn Between Two Lovers".

In 1992, a medley of remixed versions of her biggest German hits charted in Germany. A single, entitled "Jive, Connie", ended up among the top-ten best-selling singles of the year, which brought Francis the prestigious R.SH-Gold award for the "Best Comeback of the Year" from R.SH (short for "Radio Schleswig-Holstein"), back then one of Germany's most important private radio stations. A subsequent compilation album of her biggest German hits in their original versions was also released successfully. In the wake of this, Francis recorded two duets for the German Herzklang label (a subsidiary of Sony Music Entertainment) with Peter Kraus, with whom she had already worked several times in the late 1950s and early 1960s. A German-language solo album was supposed to follow on Herzklang, but despite all songs being recorded and mixed, the album remains unreleased.

In 1996, Francis released the live album The Return Concert: Live at Trump's Castle. That same year, she also released With Love to Buddy, a tribute album of songs made famous by the late Buddy Holly.

In late December 2004, Francis headlined in Las Vegas for the first time since 1989. In March and October 2007, Francis performed to sold-out crowds at the Castro Theatre in San Francisco. She appeared in concert in Manila, Philippines, on Valentine's Day 2008.

In 2010, she also appeared at the Las Vegas Hilton with Dionne Warwick, a show billed as "Eric Floyd's Grand Divas of Stage".

In December 2017, Francis released her most recent autobiography, Among My Souvenirs.

Work

Musical genres
While her singles were mostly kept in the then-current sounds of the day such as rock 'n' roll, novelty songs, the twist, torch ballads, or the girl group sound created by Brill Building alumni Ellie Greenwich and Jeff Barry, Francis' albums represented her in a variety of styles, ranging from R&B, vocal jazz, and country to Broadway standards, children's music, waltzes, spiritual music, schlager music, traditionals from various ethnic groups represented in the US, and select songs from popular songwriters of the day, such as Burt Bacharach and Hal David, or Les Reed.

Discography

Filmography

Filmography (television)

Bibliography

Personal life

Marriages
Francis has been married four times. In 1964, she was briefly married to Dick Kanellis, a press agent and entertainment director for the Aladdin Hotel. In January 1971, she married Izzy Marion, a hair-salon owner, divorcing 10 months later. In 1973, Francis married for the third timeher only marriage to last more than a few monthsJoseph Garzilli, a restaurateur and travel-agency owner; they divorced in 1977. It was during the third marriage that Francis adopted a baby boy, Joey. Francis married TV producer Bob Parkinson in 1985, divorcing later that year.

Relationship with Bobby Darin
Early in her career, Francis was introduced to Bobby Darin, then an up-and-coming singer and songwriter. Darin's manager arranged for him to help write several songs for her. Despite some disagreement about material, after several weeks Darin and Francis developed a romantic relationship. Francis' strict Italian father would separate the couple whenever possible. When her father learned that Darin had suggested the two elope after one of her shows, he ran Darin out of the building at gunpoint.

Francis saw Darin only two more times: once when the two were scheduled to sing together for a television show, and again when she was spotlighted on the TV series This Is Your Life. By the time of the latter's taping, Darin had married actress Sandra Dee. In her autobiography, Francis stated she and her father were driving into the Lincoln Tunnel when the radio DJ announced Dee and Darin's marriage. Her father made a negative comment about Darin finally being out of their lives. Angered, Francis wrote she hoped the Hudson River would fill the Lincoln Tunnel, killing both her and her father; she later wrote that not marrying Darin was the biggest mistake of her life.

Biopic
Francis and singer Gloria Estefan completed a screenplay for a movie based on Francis' life titled Who's Sorry Now? Estefan announced that she would produce and play the lead. She said, "[Connie Francis] isn't even in the Rock and Roll Hall of Fame, and yet she was the first female pop star worldwide, and has recorded in nine languages. She has done a lot of things for victims' rights since her rape in the '70s.... There's a major story there." In December 2009 the film project was dropped. According to Francis:

In the same article, Francis said that Dolly Parton had been contacting her for years trying to produce her life story, but owing to her previous commitment to Estefan's organization, she was not able to accept Parton's offer.  She noted in the article that both she and Parton had considered, independently of each other, actress Valerie Bertinelli to play Francis.

Politics and activism
Francis supported Richard Nixon's 1968 bid for the presidency when she recorded a campaign song for him.

In the 1980s, Ronald Reagan appointed her as head of his task force on violent crime. She has also been the spokeswoman for Mental Health America's trauma campaign, as well as an involved worker for the USO and UNICEF.

In a 2011 interview, Francis described herself as "a die-hard liberal".

Lawsuits
Francis brought a suit alleging that Universal Music Group (UMG) took advantage of her condition and stopped paying royalties.  The lawsuit was dismissed.

On November 27, 2002, she filed a second suit against UMG alleging the label had inflicted severe emotional distress on her and violated her moral rights when, without her permission, it synchronized several of her songs into "sexually themed" movies: the 1994 film Post Cards from America, the 1996 film The Craft, and the 1999 film Jawbreaker. This suit was also dismissed.

Francis also sued the producers of Jawbreaker for using her song "Lollipop Lips," which is heard during a sex scene.

Recognition
In 2001, "Who's Sorry Now?" was named one of the Songs of the Century.

A "Connie Francis Way" street sign is displayed at the corner of Greylock Parkway and Forest Street in Belleville, New Jersey, near the house in which she grew up.

References

External links

 
 
 
 
 The Work of Claus Ogerman, a pictorial discography showing albums and singles, along with studio photos and complete liner notes which document Francis' work in the 1960s with this arranger/conductor
 Baltimore Net Radio—Features a one-hour weekly internet radio program streaming world-wide, devoted to the music of Connie Francis: "A Visit with Connie Francis" Thursdays from 3:00–4:00 p.m. NYT, with rebroadcasts as per the program schedule

1937 births
Living people
American accordionists
Women accordionists
American country singer-songwriters
American women country singers
American women pop singers
American film actresses
American pop rock singers
American television actresses
American women rock singers
Traditional pop music singers
Dutch-language singers of the United States
French-language singers of the United States
German-language singers of the United States
Hebrew-language singers of the United States
Italian-language singers of the United States
Japanese-language singers of the United States
Latin-language singers of the United States
Portuguese-language singers of the United States
Spanish-language singers of the United States
Swedish-language singers of the United States
Yiddish-language singers of the United States
UNICEF Goodwill Ambassadors
MGM Records artists
Polydor Records artists
United Artists Records artists
Yiddish-speaking people
People of Calabrian descent
People with bipolar disorder
New Jersey Republicans
American people of Italian descent
Belleville High School (New Jersey) alumni
Newark Arts High School alumni
People from Belleville, New Jersey
People from Essex Fells, New Jersey
Actresses from Newark, New Jersey
Country musicians from New Jersey
Musicians from Newark, New Jersey
Singer-songwriters from New Jersey
Singer-songwriters from New York (state)
20th-century American actresses
20th-century American singers
21st-century American singers
20th-century American women singers
21st-century American women singers
American jazz singers
21st-century accordionists
Country musicians from New York (state)